Hardboiled & Hard Luck (ハードボイルド／ハードラック Alt: Hādoboirudo. English) is a novel written by Japanese author Banana Yoshimoto in 1999 and translated into English in 2005 by Michael Emmerich.

Plot summary

This book consists of two separate stories, making up the two parts of the book's title. The first story, Hardboiled, is written from the perspective of a woman who is hiking alone, passes a strange shrine and ends up in a hotel with a couple of surreal incidents that follow.  Her back story is filled in as a mixture of narrative and dream sequences.  The second story, Hard Luck, is about a woman whose sister Kuni is in a coma.  Kuni's fiancé leaves her after the incident, but his brother continues to visit.  It becomes apparent that he is interested in the protagonist of the story.

Book information 
Hardboiled & Hard Luck (English edition) by Banana Yoshimoto 
 Hardcover – , published by Grove Press

1999 Japanese novels
Novels by Banana Yoshimoto